The 2009–10 St. John's Red Storm men's basketball team represented St. John's University during the 2009–10 NCAA Division I men's basketball season. The team was coached by Norm Roberts in his sixth year at the school. St. John's home games are played at Carnesecca Arena and Madison Square Garden and the team is a member of the Big East Conference.

On March 30, 2010, Steve Lavin was announced as the team's new head coach, replacing Norm Roberts, who was fired after six seasons as head coach.

Off season

Departures

Class of 2009 signees

Roster

Schedule

|-
!colspan=9 style=| Non-Conference Regular Season

|-
!colspan=9 style=| Big East Conference Regular Season

|-
!colspan=9 style=| Big East tournament

|-
!colspan=9 style=| NIT Tournament

References

St. John's Red Storm men's basketball seasons
St. John's
St. John's
St John
St John